Harold Edward Daly (18 October 1915 – 27 April 1995) was an Australian rules footballer who played with Hawthorn, North Melbourne and St Kilda in the Victorian Football League (VFL).  In a brief league career, which saw him play for three clubs, Daly never once played in a winning team. He originally arrived at Hawthorn from Eaglehawk. A brother, Alan Daly, later played with Melbourne.

References

External links

1915 births
1995 deaths
Australian rules footballers from Victoria (Australia)
Hawthorn Football Club players
North Melbourne Football Club players
St Kilda Football Club players
Eaglehawk Football Club players